Max Rieger (born 10 July 1946 in Mittenwald) is a German former alpine skier who competed in the 1968 Winter Olympics and 1972 Winter Olympics.

External links
 sports-reference.com
 

1946 births
Living people
German male alpine skiers
Olympic alpine skiers of West Germany
Alpine skiers at the 1968 Winter Olympics
Alpine skiers at the 1972 Winter Olympics
People from Garmisch-Partenkirchen (district)
Sportspeople from Upper Bavaria
20th-century German people